Erebia lafontainei, the reddish alpine or Lafontaine's alpine, is a member of the subfamily Satyrinae of the family Nymphalidae. It is found in northern North America from Alaska, Yukon, and western Northwest Territories as far east as Tuktoyuktuk.

The wingspan is 33–41 mm. Adults are on the wing from mid-June to late July.

Similar species
Four-dotted alpine (E. youngi)
Scree alpine (E. anyuica)

References

External links 

 Erebia lafontainei, Butterflies and Moths of North America

Erebia
Butterflies described in 1983
Butterflies of North America